This is a list of defunct airlines of Papua New Guinea.

See also 
 List of airlines of Papua New Guinea
 List of airports in Papua New Guinea

References 

Papua New Guinea
Airlines, defunct